The School of Science and Engineering Magnet (known as the School of Science and Engineering or SEM) is a magnet college preparatory high school located in the Yvonne A. Ewell Townview Magnet Center, home of six magnet high schools in the Dallas Independent School District. SEM's mascot is an eagle, and its school colors are maroon and white. Its current principal is Andrew Palacios. Past principals include: Tiffany Huitt (who was promoted to DISD Executive Director), Jovan Carisa Wells, and Richard White.

Academics
On admission, each student is placed into one of three math and science "tracks" based on your middle school—a Regular Track, a Fast Track, and a Super Fast Track. Each track doesn't really matter when college comes and completes a different number and difficulty of math and science courses.

SEM stresses a philosophy of hands-on science education, and specializes in offering science, technology, engineering, and mathematics courses. Its mathematics courses range in complexity from Pre-AP Algebra II (the lowest-level course offered) to AP Calculus BC and its own unique Advanced Topics of the Theory of Applied Mathematics (A. T. T. A. M.) course. Science courses range from basic-level courses such as Pre-AP Biology to higher-level courses such as AP Physics C and AP Chemistry. Of special note is SEM's unique "SuperLab" class, a laboratory-based course which combines the material of both AP Physics C and AP Chemistry. Tech courses that instruct students in Computer Science concepts and the Java programming language are also available in the form of Pre-AP Computer Science A and AP Computer Science A.

Recognition

In both 2005 and 2011, SEM has received the Blue Ribbon School award by the U.S. Department of Education.

SEM was ranked as second best high school in the United States in 2007 according to the survey "The 1200 Best Public High Schools in the USA", it was eighth in 2006 and sixth in 2005. In 2007, SEM was ranked as the 18th best public high school in America by U.S. News & World Report.

The College Board announced that SEM is number 1 in the world for passing minorities in Calculus AB and number one in the United States for passing Hispanics in Computer Science. In 2006, SEM was visited by President George W. Bush for excellence in education and the school's philosophy of emphasising math and science, something he stressed in his 2006 State of the Union address. 
The school consistently ranks number one in D Magazine's Best Public High Schools in Dallas and has been named the Academic UIL District Champion for District 9-5A and 11-5A in 2006 and 2007 respectively.

In 2011, SEM was ranked the number 1 high school in America by the Washington Post. The school was also ranked number 1 in the Newsweek list of America's Best High Schools. In 2012, it was ranked the number one high school in the North Texas area by Children at Risk, a research and advocacy institute dedicated to helping children.

2012 - SEM wins the Intel School of Distinction Award for the Best High School Math Program in the Country.
2012 - SEM Ranked #2 (out of 1900 public high schools) -Washington Post High School Challenge
2012 - SEM Ranked #4 (out of 1000 public high schools) -Newsweek.com [1]

In 2018, SEM was ranked as the 13th best public high school in America by U.S. News & World Report.

In 2019, SEM was ranked as the number 1 best public high school in Texas by the U.S. News & World Report. SEM also ranked 12th place as the best public high school in America.

Extracurricular activities

Due to rules and regulations involving magnet schools, SEM has no sports teams (although students may participate in those of their home schools). However, it does provide a wide variety of extracurricular activities and UIL teams:
 
Orchestra
UIL Calculator Team
UIL Journalism Team
Academic Decathlon
"Big D" Marching Band
UIL Number Sense Team
Townview Theatre Company 
Choir
UIL Current Issues & Events Team
Intergirls
French Club
Environmental Science/Volunteering Club
Chess Club
Latin Club
Robotics 
UIL Literary Criticism
National Honor Society
National Latin Honor Society
UIL Math Team
SEM Yearbook 
UIL One Act Play
UIL Current Events 
UIL Science Team
Finance/Economics Club
Debate
UIL Social Studies
UIL Computer Science Team

SEM won the AAAAA individual UIL Computer Science event at the UIL State competition in Austin, Texas in 2001, and also won the AAAAA team UIL Computer Science competition in both 2000 and 2001. SEM also won the 2012 and 2013 Academic UIL Region 2 5A competition. At the 2015 UIL State competition in Austin, SEM put up the highest team score in UIL Calculator Applications in all of Texas.

References

External links
Science and Engineering Website
Dallas ISD home page
Student Council Announcements Site for the Class of 2009

Dallas Independent School District high schools
Public high schools in Dallas
Public magnet schools in Dallas